Dean Semmens (born 22 November 1979) is an Australian  indigenous water polo player who competed in the 2004 Summer Olympics.

References

External links
 

1979 births
Living people
Australian male water polo players
Olympic water polo players of Australia
Water polo players at the 2004 Summer Olympics
Indigenous Australian Olympians